Belfast Lough Yachting Conference (BLYC) is a group that encompasses all the yacht clubs on Belfast Lough and Larne Lough.

Its primary aim is to look after scheduling the regattas that each club host, to try to prevent clashing events.

It comprises the following ten clubs:
 Ballyholme Yacht Club
 Carrickfergus Sailing Club
 Cockle Island Boat Club
 County Antrim Yacht Club
 Donaghadee Sailing Club
 East Antrim Boat Club
 Holywood Yacht Club
 Royal North of Ireland Yacht Club
 Royal Ulster Yacht Club
 Newtownabbey Boat Club

External links
BLYC web site

Yacht clubs in Northern Ireland